This article contains statistics on UE Lleida footballers.

Top goalscorers by season

Appearance records

La Liga appearances
 Mauro Ravnic: 37 
 Urbano Ortega: 36 
 Virgilio Hernández: 35 
 Miguel Rubio: 35
 Jaime Quesada: 34 
 Txema Alonso: 34 
 Gonzalo Arguiñano: 32
 Guillermo Ramón: 28
 Sebastián Herrera: 27
 Nikola Milinković: 26

Goalscoring records

La Liga goals
 Ignacio Bidegain: 8 
 Luis Pellicer: 7 
 Nikola Milinković: 6 
 Juan Manuel Martínez: 5 
 Guillermo Ramón: 5 
 Francisco Nogués: 4 
 Virgilio Hernández: 4

Records And Statistics
Lleida
Records